The 2018–19 season was the 94th in the history of BSC Young Boys and their 23rd consecutive season in the top flight. The club participated in the Swiss Super League, the Swiss Cup, and the UEFA Champions League. The season covered the period from 1 July 2019 to 30 August 2020.

Players

Out on loan

Pre-season and friendlies

Competitions

Overall record

Swiss Super League

League table

Results summary

Results by round

Matches

Swiss Cup

UEFA Champions League

Play-off round

Group stage

References 

BSC Young Boys seasons
Young Boys
2018–19 UEFA Champions League participants seasons
Swiss football championship-winning seasons